Ihievbe (also spelled Sebe or Isebe) is a town in Owan East local government area of Edo State, Nigeria, Africa with a population of approximately 50,000 people. Geographically, it is between Auchi and Afuze. The name Ihievbe is commonly misspelled in maps and some other literature as Sebe or Isebe. The people of Ihievbe speak the Ihievbe language, a dialect of Edoid as the native language, and English as the common language. Ihievbe are Afemai people. As with the rest of Nigeria, there are two main religions, Christian and Muslim. The subsistence of the people from Ihievbe is mostly based on agriculture and animal husbandry.

References 

Populated places in Edo State
1437 establishments
15th-century establishments in Africa